Avrum M. Gross (February 25, 1936 – May 8, 2018) was an American lawyer who served as the Attorney General of Alaska from 1974 through 1980.

Early life and education 
Gross was born on February 25, 1936, in New York City. He was raised in New Jersey and was a pre-college student at the Juilliard School for violin. He graduated from Amherst College in 1957 and earned his J.D. degree from the University of Michigan, before moving to Alaska in 1961.

Career 
Gross worked for the Alaska Legislature, where he met Jay Hammond. He worked as special counsel on fisheries for the Alaska Department of Law before going into private practice. Hammond, who was elected Governor of Alaska in 1974, appointed Gross as his attorney general, though Hammond was a Republican and Gross was a Democrat. 

Hammond explained his decision to appoint Gross by saying "Well, I think it is the obligation to appoint the best legal talent available to fill position of attorney general. And to me Av Gross is right up there at the top, even his cohorts and colleagues agree.’"

As attorney general, Gross helped establish the Alaska Permanent Fund and ended the practice of plea bargaining. He served as attorney general until 1980, before returning to private practice.

Personal life 
His son, Al Gross, was a candidate for the United States Senate in the 2020 election. Gross died on May 8, 2018, from pancreatic cancer.

References

1936 births
2018 deaths
20th-century American lawyers
21st-century American Jews
Alaska Attorneys General
Alaska Democrats
Amherst College alumni
Deaths from cancer in Alaska
Deaths from pancreatic cancer
Lawyers from New York City
Jewish American people in Alaska politics
Juilliard School alumni
Politicians from New York City
University of Michigan Law School alumni